The Asa White House, also known as the White-McGiffert House, is a historic house in Eutaw, Alabama, United States.  It was built in 1838 by Asa White, one of Greene County's earliest settlers.  Eutaw was established on property owned by Asa White.  He conveyed  to the newly established county seat in 1838 for the building of a courthouse, civic buildings, and a commercial district.  He then sold residential lots to individuals.  His house is a two-story frame building.  It was built in the Federal style and later altered with the addition of Greek Revival-influenced details.  The house was recorded by the Historic American Buildings Survey in 1936.  It was added to the National Register of Historic Places as a part of the Antebellum Homes in Eutaw Thematic Resource on April 2, 1982, due to its architectural significance.

References

External links

 

National Register of Historic Places in Greene County, Alabama
Houses on the National Register of Historic Places in Alabama
Federal architecture in Alabama
Houses completed in 1838
Greek Revival houses in Alabama
Houses in Greene County, Alabama
Historic American Buildings Survey in Alabama